Chatra (code:CTR) is a small railway halt located on the Sahibganj loop. It is a small village, which comes under Murarai I (community development block).

References

Railway stations in Birbhum district
Howrah railway division